The Chu Shi Biao refers to either of two memorials written by Zhuge Liang, the Imperial Chancellor of the state of Shu during the Three Kingdoms period of China. He presented them to Liu Shan, the second emperor of Shu. The first Chu Shi Biao, which is referred to as the "Former Chu Shi Biao", was presented in 227 before Zhuge Liang embarked on the first of a series of military campaigns (commonly known as the Northern Expeditions) against Shu's rival state, Wei. The second, known as the "Later Chu Shi Biao", was supposedly submitted in 228 before Zhuge Liang left for the second Northern Expedition.

The main topics addressed in the Chu Shi Biaos included the reasons for the Northern Expeditions, as well as Zhuge Liang's personal advice to Liu Shan on how to govern and rule the state.

The authenticity of the Later Chu Shi Biao is disputed and many scholars believe that it was not written by Zhuge Liang.

Former Chu Shi Biao
The Former Chu Shi Biao was written in 227 and was recorded in Zhuge Liang's biography in the Sanguozhi.

At that time, Shu was recovering from its previous defeat at the Battle of Xiaoting in 222 and from the Southern Campaign against opposing forces in the south in 225. Zhuge Liang thought that Shu was weak so it had to be aggressive towards its rivals in order to survive. He decided to launch a campaign against Shu's rival state, Wei, in the north. This marked the start of a series of Shu invasions of Wei. Before leaving, Zhuge Liang wrote the Former Chu Shi Biao to the Shu emperor Liu Shan to explain the reasons for the campaign and to give his personal advice to Liu Shan on governance.

The Song dynasty poet Su Shi commented in the Yue Quan Xiansheng Wenji Xu (樂全先生文集敘) that Zhuge Liang's (Former) Chu Shi Biao was "simple and concise, direct but not disrespectful."

Content
The following is a rough translation of the Former Chu Shu Biao. See the notes section for further explanation of certain parts in the text.

Later Chu Shi Biao
The Later Chu Shi Biao was written in 228 and was not recorded in the original version of the Sanguozhi by Chen Shou. When Pei Songzhi made annotations to the Sanguozhi, he wrote that the Later Chu Shi Biao came from the Mo Ji (默記) by Zhang Yan (張儼). The Later Chu Shi Biao was incorporated into the Han Jin Chunqiu (漢晉春秋) by Xi Zuochi.

Many scholars have cast doubts on the authorship of the Later Chu Shi Biao and believed that it was not written by Zhuge Liang. The Qing dynasty scholar Qian Dazhao (錢大昭) expressed suspicion in his book Sanguozhi Bianyi (三國志辨疑; Doubts on Records of the Three Kingdoms). The Later Chu Shi Biao was not part of a collection of writings by Zhuge Liang, and appeared only in Zhang Yan's Mo Ji. Besides, the tone in the Later Chu Shi Biao differs largely from the Former Chu Shi Biao; the latter sounded more coercive while the former appeared more sincere and humble. The latter even included the use of analogies and historical examples in the third paragraph to urge war. It also contains a discrepancy about Zhao Yun's death: Zhao Yun died in 229, but the Later Chu Shi Biao, purportedly written in 228, already mentioned his death.

Content
The following is a rough translation of the Later Chu Shi Biao. See the notes section for further explanation of certain parts in the text.

Notable quotes
The phrase "The Han and the Evil do not stand together" from the Later Chu Shi Biao is later used to describe a situation where two opposing powers cannot coexist.

Another phrase "with deference and prudence, to the state of one's depletion; it's never finished until one's death" from the Later Chu Shi Biao is later used to describe one's commitment to strive to the utmost.

Notes

References

 Chen, Shou (3rd century). Records of the Three Kingdoms (Sanguozhi).
 Pei, Songzhi (5th century). Annotations to Records of the Three Kingdoms (Sanguozhi zhu).

External links
  Former Chu Shu Biao on Chinese Wikisource
  Later Chu Shu Biao on Chinese Wikisource

Chinese classic texts
Three Kingdoms literature
Shu Han